Ralph Kenneth Olsen (April 10, 1924 – November 28, 1994) was an American football player and coach. He played professional as defensive end in the National Football League (NFL). Olsen was drafted by the Green Bay Packers in the 32nd round of the 1947 NFL Draft and played with the team during the 1949 NFL season.  He served as the head football coach at the Montana State School of Mines—now known as Montana Tech of the University of Montana from 1952 to 1956.

References

External links
 

1924 births
1994 deaths
American football defensive ends
Green Bay Packers players
Montana Tech Orediggers athletic directors
Montana Tech Orediggers football coaches
Utah Utes football players
Sportspeople from Salt Lake City
Coaches of American football from Utah
Players of American football from Salt Lake City